Septemberland is a studio album by Martin Stenmarck, released in 2009.

Track listing
 "Som en vän"
 "Fix"
 "1000 nålar"
 "Andas"
 "Jag vill jag vill jag vill"
 "Explosionen"
 "Happy Ending"
 "Gråa hjärtans sorg"
 "J Jeff & Jesus"
 "I septemberland"

Charts

Weekly charts

Year-end charts

References

2009 albums
Martin Stenmarck albums
Swedish-language albums